Kunwar Suresh Singh hailed from the Bisen Rajput family of Kalakankar, zamindari of Oudh. Singh wrote the book titled Pant Ji Aur Kalakankar and Yadon Ke Jharokhe. He was also active in the Indian independence movement and was closely associated with Mahatma Gandhi.

Biography
He was elder brother of King Awadhesh Pratap Singh of Kalakankar. Suresh Singh and his brother Raja Awadhesh Singh met with Mahatma Gandhi for the first time in Sabarmati Ashram and later met at Kalakankar Bhavan in Lucknow. On 14 November 1929, Gandhi visited Kalakankar (now in district Pratapgarh). Kunwar Suresh Singh was a close associate of Mahatma Gandhi and taken active participation in Gandhi's every moment. Even Bapu wrote many letters to him for guidance in independence moment. Kunwar Suresh was married to Prakashvati; she died on 28 May 1987.

He was interested in Hindi literature and art that was the only reason why he wrote some books. Suresh Singh was associated with poet Sumitranandan Pant, lyricist Naeem, actor Mani Madhukar.

See also 
 Pratapgarh Estate

References 

Indian Hindus
People from Pratapgarh, Uttar Pradesh
Year of birth missing
Year of death missing
Indian independence activists from Uttar Pradesh
Gandhians